As of 2021, Hungary have appeared in four UEFA European Championships. At the 1964 European Nations' Cup, they finished third after winning their play-off against Denmark, and at Euro 1972 they placed fourth.

In the 2016 edition, Hungary finished in the round of 16, after winning the group. This was their best result in nearly four decades. They qualified again for Euro 2020 and were one of the eleven chosen host countries, but were eliminated in the group stage.

1964 European Nations' Cup

Final tournament

Semi-finals

Third place play-off

Euro 1972

Final tournament

Semi-finals

Third place play-off

Euro 2016

Group stage

Knockout phase

Round of 16

Euro 2020

Group stage

Overall record
 Champions   Runners-up   Third place   Fourth place  

*Denotes draws including knockout matches decided via penalty shoot-out.
**Red border colour indicates that the tournament was held on home soil.

References

 
Countries at the UEFA European Championship
Hungary national football team